Ash Iron Springs is an unincorporated community in Skelton Township, Warrick County, in the U.S. state of Indiana.

History
Ash Iron Springs derives its name from James Ash, a farmer who settled there in the mid-19th century. The waters of the nearby spring were locally said to have medicinal qualities.

Geography

References

Unincorporated communities in Warrick County, Indiana
Unincorporated communities in Indiana